Evelina Puzaite (born 1982) is a Lithuanian classical pianist, composer, writer, and supporter of Baltic music

Evelina was born in Vilnius, Lithuania, and was first taught piano by her mother Irena. Evelina made her concert debut as a pianist aged 6, and in the same year secured a place to study at the National M. K. Čiurlionis School of Art under Jurate Karosaitė. Aged 18 she won a full scholarship to study at the Guildhall School in London under Joan Havill

Evelina has won prizes at 12 international piano competitions including First Prize at the Rubinstein Piano Competition in Paris (1997), Second Prize in the International Competition of Belgrade, Serbia (1997), First Prize in Tel-Hai International Piano Competition, Israel (1999), Third Prize in M.K. Čiurlionis International Competition (1999), Second Prize at the Grodno Composers' Competition in Belarus (2000). She was a finalist at the Guildhall School of Music gold medal in 2004 and a semi finalist at the Top of the World International Piano Competition, Tromsø, Norway in 2009. In 2006, Evelina unanimously won the Abstract Securities Landor Competition  and was awarded a long-term recording contract with Landor Records.

Evelina made the first of several performances at the Wigmore Hall in 2007 and has played regularly under different conductors with the Lithuanian National Symphony Orchestra/Antoni Wit/Alan Buribaev/Cyril Diederich. In 2011, she was twice invited to play with the Brighton Philharmonic Orchestra under Barry Wordsworth, and was featured on radio BBC3 ‘In-Tune’ with Sean Rafferty. In 2012, Evelina made her solo Carnegie Hall debut, and her solo debut at the Rudolfinum, Prague in 2013. In 2016, Evelina completed a tour of the Mid-West which included a performance at the Casimir Parish Auditorium, Cleveland Ohio and the Dame Myra Hess concert series at the Preston Bradley Hall, Chicago Cultural Center which was simulcast on WFMT Radio.
 
In 2015 Evelina Relocated to Old Greenwich in Connecticut USA with her husband, publishing executive Anthony Davies. Together they have a 3 sons named Konstantinas Albert (b.2013), Alfred Pranas (b.2017) and Stanley Arthur (b.2019).

Discography
2001 – Evelina Puzaite piano music, M.K. Ciurlionis National School of Arts
2007 - Moments Musicaux, Landor Records
2008 – Gorecki, Life Journey, Tocatta for 2 pianos, Landor Records 
2010 – Schumann Music for Oboe and Piano with Andrius Puskunigis
2012 - AUTUMNAL Chamber Music by Thomas Hyde, Guildmusic

Works
1999 – 3 preludes op.1
1999 - Sonata in C op.2 (published in 2014 in London)
2000 - Impression for cello and piano op.3
2001 – Piece for voice and harp; 3 piano preludes op.4
2002 – Mazurka for piano; Prelude op.5
2003 - Piano trio op.6
2004 - Four Hungarian Miniatures for piano (Saulėtoji mozaika) op.7
2004 - Daina (Saulėtoji mozaika) op.7
2004 - Toccatta for 2 pianos (published in Vilnius, Vilnele 3) op.8
2008 – Tempo Primo book was published in Vilnius 2008 (presvika publishing)
2010 – Music for documentary ‘ Lieknas’/the Swamp

References

External links
 

1982 births
Women classical composers
Lithuanian classical composers
Lithuanian classical pianists
Lithuanian women pianists
Lithuanian writers
Living people
Musicians from Vilnius
Women classical pianists
21st-century classical pianists
21st-century women pianists